
Gmina Świercze is a rural gmina (administrative district) in Pułtusk County, Masovian Voivodeship, in east-central Poland. Its seat is the village of Świercze, which lies approximately 22 kilometres (13 mi) west of Pułtusk and 52 km (32 mi) north-west of Warsaw.

Villages
Gmina Świercze contains the villages and settlements of Brodowo, Bruliny, Bylice, Chmielewo, Dziarno, Gaj, Gąsiorówek, Gąsiorowo, Godacze, Gołębie, Klukówek, Klukowo, Kościesze, Kosiorowo, Kowalewice Nowe, Kowalewice Włościańskie, Ostrzeniewo, Prusinowice, Stpice, Strzegocin, Sulkowo, Świercze, Świercze-Siółki, Świerkowo, Świeszewko, Świeszewo, Wyrzyki and Wyrzyki-Pękale.

Neighbouring gminas
Gmina Świercze is bordered by the gminas of Gzy, Nasielsk, Nowe Miasto, Sońsk and Winnica.

References

External links
Polish official population figures 2006

Swiercze
Pułtusk County